The Frozen City is a novel by David Arscott and David J. Marl published in 1984.

Plot summary
The Frozen City is a novel in which a city is under a cruel regime, with movement restricted by mazelike streets.

Reception
Dave Langford reviewed The Frozen City for White Dwarf #62, and stated that "Not particularly new or astonishing in itself, this gains freshness and force from the allegorical presentation. A modest success. Fantasy's so hidebound that it's still a novelty for authors to suggest that even a benign dictatorship, or monarchy, may not be a good thing."

Reviews
Review by Brian Stableford (1985) in Fantasy Review, March 1985
Review by Sue Thomason (1985) in Vector 128
Review by Mary Gentle (1985) in Interzone, #14 Winter 1985/86

References

1984 British novels